Facing the Giants is a 2006 American Christian drama sports film directed by and starring Alex Kendrick. The supporting cast was composed of volunteers from Sherwood Baptist Church, and it is the second film that Sherwood Pictures has done. Shot in Albany, Georgia, the film tells an underdog story about American football from a Christian worldview. The film made $10.2 million on a $100,000 budget.

Plot
In 2003, Grant Taylor (Alex Kendrick) is the head football coach of the Shiloh Christian Academy Eagles and had yet to make the state playoffs or even post a winning record in his six-year tenure. After his seventh season begins with a three-game losing streak, a key player leaves for another school, and the remaining players' fathers begin to agitate for his firing. This is not the only problem Grant faces; his home has a leaking roof, his appliances are breaking down, and his car is an unreliable embarrassment.  Then, crushingly, he learns that he is the reason that his wife, Brooke, cannot become pregnant.

Suffering intense emotional turmoil, Grant stays up all night praying and studying scripture.  Finally, his old football coach inspires him to create a new coaching philosophy and praises God regardless of on-field results. At the same time he influences his players to give far greater effort and tells them they can win under God's guidance. The improved attitudes of his players influence the rest of the school. From then on, the Eagles win all their remaining regular season games and qualify for the state playoffs.

The Eagles lose their playoff opener but are awarded the win by forfeit after their opponent used ineligible players. The Eagles then advance all the way to the state championship game against the three-time and defending state champion Richland Giants. The Giants race out to a 14-0 lead, but the Eagles manages to tie the game at the start of the second half.  The Giants tack on another touchdown and a field goal before the Eagles manage to score another touchdown.

As the clock winds down, the Giants come within one yard of sealing the game with a touchdown. Defensive lineman Brock Kelley is exhausted and begs someone else to lead, but Grant encourages him to give him four more downs. Brock agrees, and the Eagles manage to get a sack, a stop, and a pass block, taking it to 4th down.  In a bit of arrogance, Richland head coach Bobby Lee Duke, insisting on a touchdown to put the game away (when a kneel down would have sealed the victory), calls for the Giants to go for it. However, Brock causes a fumble, and the Eagles can take it to the 34-yard line with 2 seconds to go.

Grant, realizing again that they cannot outrun or overpower the Giants, decides to take a huge gamble and asks for a 51-yard field goal (into the wind) from kicker David Childers, who was forced to take over when the starting kicker was knocked out early in the second half. David insists he can't kick that far but goes out there anyway. After a rousing speech from Grant, another bit of arrogance by Duke (who calls a timeout to "ice" Childers), and seeing his father Larry Childers, who is a wheelchair user, stand beyond the fence and holding his arms up, David begs for God to help him with the kick. Seemingly in response, the wind suddenly turns favorable, and Grant tells them to kick it. David's kick barely clears the uprights, allowing the Eagles to stun the Giants and win the game.

After the game, Grant tells his players that they are not inferior or lacking in ability and that nothing is impossible with God. Later that night, Brooke reveals that she's finally pregnant, causing Grant to break down in tears of joy. Two years later, it is revealed that they have a young son with another child on the way, and in the interim, the Eagles have won a second state title.

Cast

 Alex Kendrick as Grant Taylor
 Shannen Fields as Brooke Taylor
 Bill Butler as Neil Prater
 Bailey Cave as David Childers
 Steve Williams as Larry Childers
 Tracy Goode as Brady Owens
 Jim McBride as Bobby Lee Duke
 Tommy McBride as Jonathan Weston
 Jason McLeod as Brock Kelley	 
 Chris Willis as J.T. Hawkins Jr.
 Ray Wood as Mr. Bridges
 Erin Bethea as Alicia Houston
 David Nixon as Mr. Jones
 Mark Richt as himself & former coach of Grant Taylor

Most of the cast and crew were members of Sherwood Baptist Church in Albany, Georgia. For example, the role of Bobby Lee Duke, the opposing coach in the state final, was played by Sherwood Baptist associate pastor Jim McBride.

Production
The movie was shot on high definition digital video tape (using the Panasonic Varicam) and transferred to film. Using real high school football teams, the football action sequences were shot by the film's director of photography, Bob Scott, who is a veteran cinematographer for NFL Films. Another NFL Films technician, Rob Whitehurst, recorded the movie's sound. Principal photography began on April 27, 2004.

Soundtrack

 Track listing 
 Come Together - Third Day
 Voice of Truth - Casting Crowns
 Facing the Giants Theme (Score) - Mark Willard, Alex Kendrick
 Finding You - Bebo Norman
 The Deathcrawl (Score) - Mark Willard
 Completely - Ana Laura
 A Gift from God (Score) - Mark Willard
 Come on Back to Me - Third Day
 Never Give Up on Me - Josh Bates
 The Fight (Score) - Mark Willard
 With You - Mark Willard, Mark Harris
 Attempting the Impossible (Score) - Mark Willard, Alex Kendrick

Release 
The film was released to DVD in early 2007 and made its television debut on September 21, 2008, on Trinity Broadcasting Network.

Reception

Critical reception
The film received mostly negative reviews from mainstream critics. On Rotten Tomatoes, 16% of critics have given the film a positive review based on 25 reviews, with an average rating of 4.30/10. The site's critics consensus reads, "The tropes of both football and evangelical movies are gracelessly on parade in this banal, insipid drama." On Metacritic, the film has a weighted average score of 38 out of 100 based on reviews from 4 critics, indicating "generally unfavorable reviews".

Heather Boerner of Common Sense Media rated the film 3 out of 5 stars, categorizing it as "a heartwarming if overly religious story of faith" and saying its message would "speak to born-again men and their families, but, again, not their less-religious neighbors." Joel Rosenblatt of The Austin Chronicle, on the other hand, rated it 1 out of 5 stars, writing "Its feel-good storyline, shopworn message, and bottomless sermonizing would have played better in Sunday school than on the big screen, which is -- let's face it -- Babylon's turf."

Box office
In its first weekend, the film opened on 441 screens nationwide in the United States. Despite such a small number of theaters, the film opened in twelfth place with $1,343,537. The film ultimately was shown in over 1,000 theaters and grossed a total of $10,243,159. The film opened in South Korea on April 16, 2010, eventually grossing $64,828. DVD sales have totaled 2.3 million units sold in 57 countries.

Rating controversy
In May 2006, the producers of Facing the Giants received notice from the Motion Picture Association of America (MPAA) that the film would be receiving a "Parental Guidance Suggested" rating, or PG rating. The Drudge Report picked up the story on June 8, 2006, which sparked a controversy alleging that the film was being given a "PG" rating solely because of its religious theme.

According to the film's producers, they were told the motion picture received a PG rating because of its strong religious themes and because it elevated one religion over another.  The MPAA later explained that Facing the Giants contains football violence and also deals with the mature topics of infertility and depression.

The Kendrick brothers expected the PG rating because of the movie's mature themes and did not appeal the board's rating.

References

External links
 
 
 
 

2006 films
2006 drama films
2006 independent films
2000s American films
2000s English-language films
2000s high school films
2000s sports drama films
American independent films
American sports drama films
Film controversies in the United States
Films about evangelicalism
Films directed by Alex Kendrick
Films set in 2003
Films set in 2005
Films set in Georgia (U.S. state)
Films shot in Georgia (U.S. state)
High school football films
Rating controversies in film
Religious controversies in film
Religious drama films
Religious sports films
Sherwood Pictures films